Black Earth is the debut studio album by Swedish melodic death metal band Arch Enemy. The album was reissued on 24 April 2007 on Regain Records, featuring "Losing Faith", two Iron Maiden covers and the video for "Bury Me an Angel".

Track listing

"The Ides of March" and "Aces High" are covers of Iron Maiden songs, from the albums Killers and Powerslave respectively.

Reception

Black Earth was critically well received. Anders Sandvall of Metal Rules stated that "the album is brilliant and there are no bad songs on it." AllMusic's critic Alex Henderson wrote in his review that "Black Earth was a promising debut for Arch Enemy and is among the Swedish combo's more consistent and memorable efforts."

Ron Salden of Archaic Magazine said that Black Earth is a classic and praised the songs writing they "showcase a fresh mixture of death/thrash metal whilst the Amott brothers rip their guitars exquisitely to delightful bits of melody, harmony lines, guitar licks and solos." He praised "Bury Me an Angel" and comments that the songs "Eureka", "Transmigration Macabre" and "Fields of Desolation" still sounds fresh in these days. Chad Bowar of About.com said that the album sound "was raw, but the songs still were very catchy with solid guitar work from Michael and Christopher Amott".

About the songs, Metal Review's journalist Jason Jordan states: Dark Insanity' is arguably the best of the lot due to its fantastic riffs and leads, which Erlandsson backs up with a pummeling, and at times appropriately restrained, performance." He also comments that some songs like "Idolatress", "Cosmic Retribution", "Transmigration Macabre" and "Fields of Desolation" have praiseworthy characteristics too, though none quite match the verve of the openers. Jordan praised mainly the band members writing that "Black Earth is a solid outing of melodic death metal with each member in fine form", and that "the brothers Amott turn in excellent performances as the band's guitarists, Daniel Erlandsson provides backbone support from atop the throne, and Johan Liiva contributes his unique vocals to one of the better Arch Enemy efforts."

Personnel
Personnel credits adapted from the album's liner notes.

Arch Enemy
 Johan Liiva – vocals
 Michael Amott – rhythm guitar, lead guitar, bass, co-production, mixing, design
 Christopher Amott – lead guitar
 Daniel Erlandsson – drums

Production 
 Fredrik Nordström – production, engineering, mixing, keyboards
 Wez Wenedikter – executive production, design
 Baskim Zuta – assistant engineering
 Miran Kim – cover art
 Kenneth Johansson – band photography
 Urszula Striner – model photography
 Sara Grundquist – model
 Johanna Lindskough – make-up artist
 M&A Music Art – layout

References

External links
 Black Earth at Encyclopaedia Metallum
 Black Earth at Discogs

1996 debut albums
Arch Enemy albums
Albums produced by Fredrik Nordström
Albums recorded at Studio Fredman
Century Media Records albums